The Marcy Brothers were an American country music trio formed in Oroville, California, in 1983 and disbanded in 1999. The trio consisted of three brothers: Kevin, Kris, and Kendal Marcy. They released two albums for divisions of Warner Music Group and charted six singles on the Billboard country charts. Their highest hit was "Cotton Pickin' Time" at No. 34.

Music career
The Marcy Brothers' debut album, Missing You, was released on October 23, 1989, on Warner Bros. Records' Nashville division. The album peaked at No. 75 on the Billboard Top Country Albums chart and saw a total of five single charting, including their highest chart single, "Cotton Pickin' Time", which reached No. 34 on the Hot Country Singles & Tracks (now Hot Country Songs) chart in 1989. Other single releases include "The Things I Didn't Say", "Threads of Gold", "You're Not Even Crying", and the title track. Blake Shelton covered "Cotton Pickin' Time" on his 2004 album Blake Shelton's Barn & Grill.

On July 9, 1991, the group released their self-titled second studio album on Warner Bros.' sister label, Atlantic Records. This album produced the singles "She Can" and "Why Not Tonight" before the trio exited the label and disbanded. Also included on the album was the Don Von Tress composition "Don't Tell My Heart", a song which would later become a five-week Number One on the country charts in 1992 when Billy Ray Cyrus recorded it under the title "Achy Breaky Heart". Kendal has since joined Brad Paisley's road band, the Drama Kings, in which he plays the banjo, keyboards, mandolin, and sings background vocals.

Members
Kevin Marcy - vocals, acoustic guitar
Kris Marcy - vocals, guitars
Kendall Marcy - vocals, guitars, mandolin, keyboards, piano

Discography

Albums

Singles

Music videos

References

Country music groups from California
Musical groups established in 1988
Sibling musical trios
Vocal trios
Warner Records artists
Atlantic Records artists
Musical groups disestablished in 1991
People from Oroville, California